The 2023 Mountain West Conference men's basketball tournament was the postseason men's basketball tournament for the Mountain West Conference. It was held March 8–11, 2023, at the Thomas & Mack Center on the campus of University of Nevada, Las Vegas, in Paradise, Nevada. The tournament champion received the conference's automatic bid to the NCAA tournament.

Seeds 
The defending champions from the prior season were the Boise State Broncos.

All 11 Mountain West schools participated in the tournament. Teams were be seeded by conference record with a tiebreaker system to seed teams with identical percentages. The top five teams received byes into the tournament quarterfinals. The remaining teams played in the first round. Tie-breaking procedures remained unchanged since the 2020 tournament.

Head-to-head record between the tied teams
 Record against the highest-seeded team not involved in the tie, going down through the seedings as necessary
 Higher NET

Schedule

Bracket 

* denotes overtime period

References 

Tournament
Mountain West Conference men's basketball tournament
Basketball competitions in the Las Vegas Valley
College basketball tournaments in Nevada
Mountain West Conference men's basketball tournament
Mountain West Conference men's basketball tournament
College sports tournaments in Nevada